Amed Sportif Faaliyetler Kulübü, shortly Amed S.K. is the women's football team of the same-named Diyarbakır-based sports club, formerly known as Diyarbakır Büyükşehir Belediyespor. The team completed the 2016–17 season of Turkish Women's Second Football League as runner-up, and were promoted to the Turkish Women's First Football League.

History 
The club was renamed Amed Sportif Faaliyetler (literally Amed Sportive Activities) from the metropolitan municipality sponsored club Diyarbakır Büyükşehir Belediyespor in August 2015. "Amed" is the name of Diyarbakır in Kurdish language.

The team finished the 2016–17 Women's Second League season as division champion and winner after a play-off match, and were promoted to the First League. From 2018 until February 2019 the fans of the club were banned to enter the stadium at away games.

Stadium 
Amed SFK play their home matches at Talaytepe Sports Facility in Talaytepe neighborhood of Kayapınar district in Diyarbakır.

Statistics 
.

(1) Season discontinued due to COVID-19 pandemic in Turkey
(2) Group rank
(3) Season in progress

Current squad 
.

Head coach:  Ramazan Erin

Kit history

Squad history

References

Women's football clubs in Turkey
Sport in Diyarbakır